RFA Spalake (A260) was a coastal water carrier of the Royal Fleet Auxiliary and one of two ships of the class to be built in Bristol by Charles Hill & Sons.

References

Spa-class coastal water carriers
1946 ships